The 1997 CFL dispersal draft took place on March 12, 1997, to distribute players who were under contract to the Ottawa Rough Riders at the time of their disbandment. The Saskatchewan Roughriders were awarded a bonus selection as well as the first selection in the first round. Otherwise the order of selection was determined based on priority waiver (reverse standings from 1996, with the 84th Grey Cup loser selecting second last and 84th Grey Cup winner selecting last in each round). Teams were permitted to trade selections, consequently, Winnipeg traded their first selection to Edmonton for Cody Ledbetter. 32 players were selected in the five-round draft, including 20 import players.

Bonus pick

Round one

Round two

Round three

Round four

Round five

References

1997 in Canadian football
Ottawa Rough Riders